"I Hope You Dance" is a crossover country pop song written by Mark D. Sanders and Tia Sillers and recorded by American country music singer Lee Ann Womack with Sons of the Desert. (Drew and Tim Womack of Sons of the Desert are not related to Lee Ann.) It is the title track on Womack's 2000 album. Released in March 2000, the song reached number one on both the Billboard Hot Country Singles & Tracks and Hot Adult Contemporary Tracks charts, and also reached number fourteen on the Billboard Hot 100. It is considered to be Womack's signature song, and it is the only Billboard number one for both Womack and Sons of the Desert.

"I Hope You Dance" won the 2001 Country Music Association (CMA) Award for Single of the Year, as well as the Academy of Country Music (ACM), Nashville Songwriters Association International (NSAI), and Broadcast Music Incorporated (BMI) awards for Song of the Year. It also won the Grammy Award for Best Country Song and was nominated for Grammy Award for Song of the Year. "I Hope You Dance" is ranked 352 in the list Songs of the Century compiled by Recording Industry Association of America (RIAA). "I Hope You Dance" reached its 2 million sales mark in the United States in October 2015, and as of August 2016, it has sold 2,093,000 digital copies in the US.

Background
Womack told The Today Show, "You can't hear those lyrics and not think about children and—and—and hope for the future and things you want for them. And those are the things I want for them in life. I want them to feel small when they stand beside the ocean." She also said, "Sometimes I have fun and lighthearted things. But even 'I Hope You Dance.' I was so shocked to see the way the kids got it. When—when I say kids, I mean, you know, like teenagers. And we saw a big difference in our audience and—and the young kids that were coming out to the shows and really into 'I Hope You Dance.' It turned into like a prom and graduation theme." Womack told The Early Show, "I thought it was very special. It made me think about Aubrie and Anna Lise [her daughters]. And I—I didn't know—I can't predict if something's going to be a big hit or not. But it certainly hit home with a lot of people, connected with a lot of people and took me a lot of new places that I had not been able to go before and took my career to a new level."

Womack told Billboard, "It made me think about my daughters and the different times in their lives....But it can be so many things to different people. Certainly, it can represent everything a parent hopes for their child, but it can also be for a relationship that's ending as a fond wish for the other person's happiness or for someone graduating, having a baby, or embarking on a new path. It fits almost every circumstance I can think of."

In 2006 Womack told Billboard about an incident at the Country Radio Seminar, recalling that, after a night of drinking, "I completely blanked out on the lyrics of 'I Hope You Dance,' of all songs. Lucky for me, most of the audience was hung over too and had a good sense of humor about it."

Composition
"I Hope You Dance" is a mid-tempo country pop ballad in which the narrator expresses her wishes to an unknown "you." It was not written as a song from a parent to a child. Over time it has been adopted as a song for people who've lost someone, a song that encourages survivors to live life to its fullest.

Two versions of Womack's recording were released. The original version features Sons of the Desert (who, like Womack, were signed to MCA at the time) singing a counterpoint chorus alongside Womack's main chorus, while a second version of the song released for pop radio omits the counterpoint chorus in favor of background vocals to accompany the main chorus. The song was also Sons of the Desert's first Top 40 country hit since "Leaving October" in 1998. The music video features Lee Ann Womack singing the song to her daughters.

Critical reception
Editors at Billboard gave the song a positive review and wrote, "This is a career record. Years from now, when critics are discussing Womack's vocal gifts and impressive body of work, this is a song that will stand out. It's one of those life-affirming songs that makes you pause and take stock of how you're living. It's filled with lovely poetry that will make listeners think. It's a great song, and Womack does it justice. Her sweet, vulnerable voice perfectly captures the tender sentiment of the lyric. The production is clean and understated, letting Womack's stunning vocal and the great lyric take center stage. Excellence deserves to be rewarded." Ken Barnes of USA Today listed "I Hope You Dance" as the fourth best song of 2000 and wrote, "Uplifting message song whose greeting-card sentiments and imprecise rhymes are outweighed by a gorgeous performance by today's reigning pure-country vocalist."

Music video
Directed by Gerry Wenner in Nashville and featuring an elongated mix of the song, running for nearly five minutes, the music video features Womack singing while in a blue room, as well as playing, frolicking, and sleeping with her two daughters. Other scenes feature her oldest daughter Aubrie carrying her youngest Anna Lise into a gated area to watch a ballet show somewhat reminiscent of "Swan Lake".

Live performances
Womack performed the song at The Early Show on October 4, 2000. It was also performed on The Tonight Show in June 2000. In July 2016, Womack performed the song with Rachel Platten in a medley with Platten's "Stand by You" on the short-lived ABC series Greatest Hits.

Book
A self-help book edition of "I Hope You Dance" was published in October 2000. The book, written by Sillers and Sanders with an introduction by Womack, includes a CD with the acoustic version of the song performed by Womack. The book sold over 2,000,000 copies before it went out of print in 2017. The primary reason it sold that many copies is that Oprah read the lyrics from the book when she had LeeAnn Womack on her show. And the reason Oprah was a fan of the song was because Maya Angelou had called her and said something to the effect of "Girl, I didn't write this but if I ever did write a song for this is exactly what I would say." The song was sung by Womack at Maya Angelou's funeral.

Awards and nominations

|-
| 2000
| Country Music Association Awards
| Single of the Year
| 
|-
| rowspan="5" | 2001
| rowspan="2" | 43rd Annual Grammy Awards
| Best Country Song
| 
|-
| Song of the Year
| 
|-
| Academy of Country Music Awards
| rowspan="3" | Song of the Year
| 
|-
| BMI Country Awards
| 
|-
| Nashville Songwriters Association International Awards
| 
|}

Track listings

US CD and cassette single
 "I Hope You Dance" (pop version) – 4:04
 "I Hope You Dance" (album version) – 4:54

US 7-inch single
A. "I Hope You Dance" (album version) – 4:54
B. "Lonely Too" – 3:27

UK CD single
 "I Hope You Dance" (Rawling mix: radio edit) – 4:05
 "I Hope You Dance" (UK pop version) – 3:57
 "I Hope You Dance" (original radio edit) – 3:59
 "I Hope You Dance" (Rawling club mix) – 7:25

Australian maxi-CD single
 "I Hope You Dance" (US pop version) – 3:59
 "I Hope You Dance" (UK pop version) – 4:47
 "I Hope You Dance" (album version) – 4:54
 "Why They Call It Love" – 1:00
 "Ashes by Now" (snippet) – 1:22
 "After I Fall" (snippet) – 1:02

Charts

Weekly charts

Lee Ann Womack with Sons of the Desert

Lee Ann Womack

Year-end charts

Certifications

Release history

Ronan Keating version

"I Hope You Dance" was covered by Irish singer-songwriter Ronan Keating and released as the first single from his greatest hits compilation, 10 Years of Hits (2004). The single was released on September 27, 2004, peaking at number two on the UK Singles Chart. The single featured a new version of "This Is Your Song", a song recorded when Keating lost his mother in 1998. Royalties from sales of the single were donated to the organization Breast Cancer Care.

Track listings
UK CD single
 "I Hope You Dance" – 3:34
 "This Is Your Song" – 3:58
 "I Hope You Dance" (Mothership mix) – 3:54

European CD single
 "I Hope You Dance" – 3:34
 "This Is Your Song" – 3:58

Charts

Weekly charts

Year-end charts

Gladys Knight version

"I Hope You Dance" was covered by American singer/songwriter Gladys Knight and released as a single from her album, Another Journey. The single was released in June 2013.

See also
 List of Billboard Adult Contemporary number ones of 2001

References

2000 singles
2000 songs
2000s ballads
2004 singles
Country ballads
Lee Ann Womack songs
MCA Nashville Records singles
Polydor Records singles
Pop ballads
Ronan Keating songs
Song recordings produced by Mark Wright (record producer)
Songs about dancing
Songs written by Mark D. Sanders
Songs written by Tia Sillers
Sons of the Desert (band) songs
Vocal collaborations